Boeremia exigua is the type species of the fungus genus, Boeremia, in the Didymellaceae family. It was first described as Phoma exigua by John Baptiste Henri Joseph Desmazières in 1849, and transferred to the genus, Boeremia, by M.M. Aveskamp, J. de Gruyter, J.H.C. Woudenberg, G.J.M. Verkley and P.W. Crous in 2010.

Desmazières describes the species as occurring on stems and dried leaves, with two varieties: one of which is found on the stems and leaves of a Polygonum species, and the other on the stems and leaves of Ranunculus.

References

External links
Boeremia exigua occurrence data and images from GBIF

Pleosporales
Taxa named by John Baptiste Henri Joseph Desmazières
Fungi described in 1849